Anthony Sherwood is a Canadian actor, producer, director and writer.

Biography
Sherwood was born in Halifax, Nova Scotia. Sherwood's grandmother, Alice Kane (née Alice White), was a musician and music teacher, his mother was an amateur singer, and his first cousin once-removed was Canadian opera singer, Portia White, Canada's first African Canadian opera singer. Sherwood's family moved to Montreal, where he grew up in the neighborhood called Little Burgundy. Sherwood commenced an eight-year career as a R&B singer before switching focus to acting. He has acted in both Canadian and American feature films and television series and received several awards for his work in the entertainment industry.

Career

Sherwood began his acting career on stage and started in musical theatre in Montreal starting in 1975. He starred in such stage musicals as Ain't Misbehavin', Cabaret, and The Music Man. He began acting in several Canadian and American feature films starting in 1979. In 1986, he joined the cast of the American television series, Airwolf II, playing the role of Jason Locke. In 1989, Sherwood played the role of Dillon Beck in the CBC Television series, Street Legal. He portrayed this role on Street Legal from 1989–1994 and was nominated in 1992 for a Gemini Award Best Performance by an Actor in a Supporting Role. 

He has guest-starred in a variety of television shows including: Beauty & The Beast, Single Ladies, Lost Girl, The Art of More, The Listener, Aaron Stone, Being Erica, Due South, Outer Limits, Soul Food, Earth: Final Conflict, PSI Factor, 1-800 Missing, Danger Bay, Adventure Inc., Diamonds, Alfred Hitchcock Presents, Night Heat, The Best Years, The New Ghostwriter Mysteries, and Counterstrike.

Sherwood has appeared in feature films, including; Race (2015), Star Spangled Banners (2013), Honey (2003), Hostile Takeover (1988), Deadbolt (1992), Undue Influence, Switching Channels, Eddie & the Cruisers II: Eddie Lives, Closer and Closer, Crimes of Fashion, Terror Train, Too Close to Home, Free of Eden, Ultimate Deception, Both Sides of The Law, Mail To The Chief, Threshold, Physical Evidence and Guilty as Sin (1993).

In 2009, Sherwood returned to the stage performing in the role of Marty in the musical Dreamgirls at the Grand Theatre in London, Ontario. In 2015, he performed the leading role in the Shakespeare play, Othello for Ale House Theatre.

Writing, producing and directing career

In 1991, Sherwood formed his production company, Anthony Sherwood Productions, that specialized in productions emphasizing issues of social justice and African-Canadian history and culture. His film company produced the feature documentary Honour Before Glory, which he wrote, produced and directed. The film won second prize at the 2002 Hollywood Black Film Festival in Los Angeles and a 2002 Gemini Award. Sherwood created and produced the documentary film Music - A Family Tradition for the CBC, which won a Gemini Award in 1997 and was nominated for an International Emmy Award. He also produced and directed a documentary film entitled Nowhere to Run, which looks at the global crisis of landmines. His film Mozambique – A Land of Hope looks at the HIV/AIDS epidemic in Africa and was broadcast on the Signature Series on OMNI Television and was featured at the World AIDS Conference in Toronto in August 2006. His documentary film 100 Years of Faith is about the oldest black church in the Province of Quebec. In 2009, he produced and directed the documentary film Knocking On Heaven's Door, which looked at the gang violence in Kingston, Jamaica.

From 1993–2000, Sherwood was the host and narrator of the documentary television series Forbidden Places for the Discovery Channel. On this television series, he performed numerous duties including writer, director, narrator and host. From 2002–2005, he was the host of the television talk-show In The Black for OMNI Television, the first talk-show on Canadian television featuring exclusive interviews with prominent African-Canadians.

In February 2010, Sherwood wrote, directed and produced an educational play on great African-Canadian hero William Hall. In 2012, Sherwood wrote and directed the stage play TITANIC: The Untold Story, which was produced to commemorate the 100th anniversary of the sinking of the Titanic. The play had its world premiere at the Alderney Landing Theatre in Nova Scotia. In July 2016, Sherwood wrote, directed and co-produced the play, "The Colour of Courage" which commemorated the 100th anniversary of the formation of Canada's all-black military unit in WWI.

In March 2015, Sherwood released his first novel, Music In The Dark, which is published by Pottersfield Press.

Social activism

From 1992–2001, Sherwood was national co-chairman of the March 21 Campaign for the federal government of Canada. March 21 is the International Day For the Elimination of Racism. Sherwood has received international recognition and awards for his efforts in raising awareness to the importance of racial equality.

On July 9, 2022, Anthony Sherwood served as Master of Ceremonies for the Government of Canada's official apology to the Black soldiers of No. 2 Construction Battalion and their descendants. The apology was delivered by Prime Minister Justin Trudeau.

Awards

1998: Martin Luther King Jr. Achievement Award
1998: Brampton Arts Acclaim Award
2000: Urban Alliance on Race Relations Award
2002: African-Canadian Achievement Award
2006: North American Black Historical Museum & Cultural Centre Award
2006: Planet Africa Award
2008: Harry Jerome Award
2022: Queen's Platinum Jubilee Medal

References 

http://montrealgazette.com/entertainment/arts/for-black-battalion-not-all-fights-were-on-the-battlefield
https://web.archive.org/web/20180228021532/http://thechronicleherald.ca/editorials/1378301-editorial-the-no.-2-construction-battalion-won-two-wars-for-canada
http://www.collectionscanada.gc.ca/03/0360_e.html
http://thechronicleherald.ca/artslife/68817-titanic-play-about-love-courage
https://www.theglobeandmail.com/arts/television/street-legal-murder-politics-sex-most-important-a-hit/article4370631/
http://www.canadiantheatre.com/dict.pl?term=Black%20Theatre%20Workshop
http://www.canadiantheatre.com/dict.pl?term=Sherwood%2C%20Anthony
https://web.archive.org/web/20190914025108/http://www.tvarchive.ca/database/16205/airwolf_ii/details/
https://web.archive.org/web/20190913234357/http://www.tvarchive.ca/database/18618/street_legal/details/
http://www.broadwayworld.com/toronto/article/OTHELLO-Set-for-Ale-House-Theatre-417-52-20150330#
http://www.cbc.ca/news/canada/nova-scotia/ns-celebrates-100-anniversary-all-black-unit-1.3481001
http://thechronicleherald.ca/canada/1347386-nova-scotia-celebrates-100th-anniversary-of-all-black-unit-fighting-to-fight
http://thechronicleherald.ca/artslife/80885-titanic-tale-fuses-tragedy-truth
https://theatreinlondon.ca/2009/04/dreamgirls-review-2/
http://www.collectionscanada.gc.ca/03/0360_e.html

External links
 
 Anthony Sherwood Productions

1949 births
Living people
Canadian male film actors
Black Canadian male actors
Black Nova Scotians
Canadian male television actors
Canadian people of Jamaican descent
Film producers from Nova Scotia
Canadian theatre directors
Male actors from Halifax, Nova Scotia
Canadian Film Centre alumni
Canadian male musical theatre actors